Cornelius "Cornell" Glen CM (born 21 October 1981) is a Trinidadian former professional footballer who played as a forward.

Club career
Glen began his professional career in 1999 with Trinidadian club FUTGOF. After two years with FUTGOF, Glen moved to Portugal, where he played for Sanjoanense. After playing slightly over a season there, he returned to Trinidad and Tobago, where he joined San Juan Jabloteh. Glen dominated the league with Jabloteh, leading the club to two consecutive league championships in 2002 and 2003, while registering 12 and 26 goals in the respective seasons.

After scoring a hat trick in a CONCACAF Champions Cup game against the Chicago Fire on 17 March 2004, Glen was bought by the MetroStars of Major League Soccer. In his first season Glen made a significant impact, registering six goals and two assists as he competed for playing time on a very crowded MetroStars front line.

Glen was traded to FC Dallas after the year for a first round pick in the 2005 MLS SuperDraft, but as the club had also acquired Carlos Ruiz he could not find any playing time among Dallas's other options at striker. Glen was traded to the Columbus Crew early in the 2005 season for a future draft pick without ever suiting up for Dallas. After scoring four goals for the Crew, he was on the move again after the season, being dealt to the Colorado Rapids for Ritchie Kotschau. Glen played only one game for the Rapids—the opener of the 2006 season—before being traded to the Los Angeles Galaxy.

In his Galaxy debut he scored two late goals in the "SuperClasico" against Chivas USA from Landon Donovan assists, which turned around the 1–0 score and gave the "sash" a 2–1 win. His late-game heroics made Glen an instant fan favorite in Los Angeles.

Following the 2006 FIFA World Cup Glen returned to action with the Galaxy in U.S. Open Cup play against the Colorado Rapids, but aggravated an injury he suffered during the World Cup, and missed the rest of the season. He was waived by the Galaxy during the 2007 pre-season.

After briefly returning to Trinidad to play for San Juan Jabloteh in 2007, Glen trialled Leeds United from the English Coca-Cola Football League One in January 2008, but was not offered a contract.

Glen went on trial with Major League Soccer side San Jose Earthquakes in May 2009 and successfully signed a one-year deal with the club shortly thereafter.  He scored his first goal for San Jose on 30 May 2009 against Real Salt Lake and ended the 2009 season with four goals as San Jose struggled in the standings. Much of Glen's time with the Earthquakes was plagued by injuries, and following a statistically disappointing 2010 season his contract was not renewed by the San Jose club.

He joined Caledonia AIA in April 2011. Glen agreed to a six-month deal with Sông Lam Nghệ An of the V-League in December 2011. Upon return to Trinidad and Tobago, he signed with North East Stars for the 2012–13 season. On 17 June 2013, Glen signed for an I-League club Shillong Lajong for 2 years.

Glen signed with Mohun Bagan A.C. on 7 October 2015. On 8 January 2016, he made his debut, scoring twice in a 3–1 win over Aizawl F.C.

In the 2015–16 season of I-League, he emerged as the top goal scorer of Mohun Bagan with 11 goals.

After a season with Mohun Bagan, Glen signed with Bangalore Super Division outfit Ozone FC from Bangalore on 2 August 2016.

International career
Glen (whose name is often misspelled "Glenn") has been a regular for Trinidad and Tobago since 2002, and was named in the squad for the 2006 FIFA World Cup.

Glen appeared in all three of Trinidad & Tobago's games at the World Cup. His shot nearly upset Sweden in the Caribbean team's historic World Cup debut which ended in a draw. Trinidad & Tobago were eliminated in the first round after losing to England and Paraguay, but Glen's performances during the tournament earned him praise and recognition.

Personal life
As a member of the squad that competed at the 2006 FIFA World Cup in Germany, Glen was awarded the Chaconia Medal (Gold Class), the second highest state decoration of Trinidad and Tobago.

Honours
Mohun Bagan
Federation Cup (India): 2015–16

Bengaluru FC
Federation Cup (India): 2016–17

Individual
 Chaconia Medal Gold Class
I-League top scorer: 2013–14

References

External links

 
 

Trinidad and Tobago footballers
Association football forwards
Trinidad and Tobago international footballers
New York Red Bulls players
FC Dallas players
Columbus Crew players
Colorado Rapids players
LA Galaxy players
San Jose Earthquakes players
2005 CONCACAF Gold Cup players
2006 FIFA World Cup players
2013 CONCACAF Gold Cup players
1981 births
Living people
TT Pro League players
San Juan Jabloteh F.C. players
North East Stars F.C. players
Song Lam Nghe An FC players
Major League Soccer players
Ma Pau Stars S.C. players
Recipients of the Chaconia Medal
Shillong Lajong FC players
Mohun Bagan AC players
NorthEast United FC players
Bengaluru FC players
I-League players
Trinidad and Tobago expatriate footballers
Trinidad and Tobago expatriate sportspeople in the United States
Expatriate soccer players in the United States
Trinidad and Tobago expatriate sportspeople in India
Expatriate footballers in India